William Edward Wagner (born July 25, 1971), nicknamed "Billy the Kid", is an American former professional baseball pitcher who played 16 seasons in Major League Baseball (MLB). He pitched for the Houston Astros (1995–2003), Philadelphia Phillies (2004–2005), New York Mets (2006–2009), Boston Red Sox (2009), and Atlanta Braves (2010). Wagner is one of only six major league relief pitchers to accumulate at least 400 career saves.

A natural-born right-hander, Wagner learned to throw left-handed after fracturing his arm twice in his youth. His 11.9 strikeouts per 9 innings pitched ratio (K/9) is the highest of any major league pitcher with at least 800 innings pitched. He was a seven-time All-Star and the 1999 National League (NL) Rolaids Relief Man Award winner. He finished in the top ten in saves in the NL ten times, and in the top ten in games finished nine times.

Early life
Wagner was born to 16-year-old Yvonne and 18-year-old William “Hotrod” Wagner in Marion, Virginia on July 25, 1971. Wagner's parents divorced in 1976 when he was five years old. Wagner and his younger sister, Chasity, spent the following ten years living variously with combinations of their parents, their stepparents, and their grandparents in the general Marion area. During this time, Wagner and his family often relied on food stamps. Wagner described a typical breakfast as a "few crackers with peanut butter and a glass of water."

At seven years old, Wagner's right arm was broken while playing football. Shortly after having the cast removed, he broke the arm again. During this time, Wagner, a natural right-hander, began throwing a baseball left-handed.

Despite having fallen behind a year in school due to the instability in his home life, Wagner was socially promoted to Tazewell High School because administrators feared he threw hard enough to injure his middle school classmates.

Career

Amateur career
Wagner graduated from Tazewell High School in Tazewell, Virginia, compiling a .451 batting average, 23 stolen bases, 29 runs batted in, 116 strikeouts in 46 innings, a 7-1 pitching record, and a 1.52 ERA in his senior season of baseball.

Wagner chose to follow his cousin to Ferrum College, a small liberal arts college in Ferrum, Virginia, where they both played baseball and football. Coaches at Ferrum encouraged Wagner to focus on baseball and he would eventually take their advice and stop playing football.

After the 1992 season, he played collegiate summer baseball with the Brewster Whitecaps of the Cape Cod Baseball League (CCBL), was named the league's outstanding pro prospect, and is a member of the CCBL Hall of Fame class of 2022.

In 2012, Wagner was inducted into the Virginia Sports Hall of Fame.

Houston Astros

Minor leagues and early major league career: 1993−97
Wagner was selected in the first round of the Major League Baseball draft in June 1993 by the Houston Astros.  He pitched exclusively as a starting pitcher in Minor League Baseball for the Quad Cities River Bandits, until his major league debut.  In 1994, Wagner led all North American minor league pitchers in strikeouts, with 204.  Wagner made his first Major League appearance with the Astros, as a late-season promotion from AAA baseball, on September 12, 1995, pitching against one batter late in a 10–5 defeat by the New York Mets. This was his only opportunity to pitch for the Astros that season.

Wagner began in 1996, once again in the minor leagues as a starting pitcher, but he finished the season by becoming a relief pitcher for the Astros. He accumulated a 6–2 record with a 3.28 ERA, in twelve starts for the AAA Tucson Toros. His baseball contract was purchased by the Astros on June 2, 1996, and Wagner was then assigned exclusively as a short-relief pitcher by the Astros manager. He finished the Major League season with nine saves in 13 opportunities, allowed 28 hits, and he struck out 67 hitters in  innings – giving him a rate of 11.7 strikeouts per nine innings pitched. His opponents had a batting average of .165 against him.

In 1997, Wagner played his first full season in the Major Leagues. He accumulated 23 saves from 29 save opportunities, and he struck out 106 batters in  innings. This set a Major League record of 14.4 strikeouts per nine innings, which broke the old record of 14.1 set by the former Cincinnati Reds relief pitcher Rob Dibble in 1992 (with 110 strikeouts in  innings).

Wagner struck out the side 13 times in his 66 innings pitched, and his season total of 106 strikeouts set a Houston Astros record for relief pitchers.

1998−99
In 1998, Wagner posted a 4–3 record with a 2.70 ERA and 97 strikeouts in 60 innings pitched. He saved 30 games, which was the third-best single season in team history. He converted 19 consecutive save chances between his first blown save against the Los Angeles Dodgers, on April 12, and then his second one facing the St. Louis Cardinals on July 11.

On July 15, 1998, while protecting an 8–7 lead over the Arizona Diamondbacks, Wagner was struck by a batted ball on the left side of his head behind his ear. Wagner was alert and conscious on the ground, and his vital signs remained good. He was carried off the baseball diamond on a stretcher, and it was found that he had suffered a concussion. He spent the night in the hospital. On the next day, he flew home to Houston, and he was also immediately placed on baseball's 15-day disabled list. Wagner worked on his balance and coordination for weeks before he was cleared by the team physicians to embark on a rehabilitation assignment with a minor-league team. After pitching there in three games, Wagner was recalled to the Astros on August 6, and he completed the rest of the baseball season there without incident. The Astros won a franchise-best 102 games while winning the National League Central division title and leading the league in runs scored. Their season ended with a defeat at the hands of the San Diego Padres in the National League Division Series.

Wagner captured the 1999 Relief Man of the Year Award in the National League. He saved 39 games and struck out 124 in 74 innings (15 strikeouts per 9 innings). Wagner posted a 4–1 record with an ERA of 1.57 and had more saves than hits allowed (in  innings, he allowed 35 hits).

2000−03
The 2000 season started off in typical fashion for Wagner, who saved three of the Astros' first four wins while retiring 16 of the first 20 batters he faced. However, after recording a save on May 4 against the Chicago Cubs, he suffered back-to-back blown saves on May 12–13 against the Reds. While he was still occasionally throwing 100 m.p.h. as measured by radar, he was not throwing his slider at 85–90 m.p.h. as often as he had been previously. Wagner continued to struggle before going on the disabled list with a torn flexor tendon in his pitching arm and would miss the final three and a half months of the season. He finished with a 2–4 record, a 6.18 ERA, and six saves in 15 opportunities, striking out 28 and walking 18 in  innings. He would rebound in 2001. Coming off elbow surgery, he posted a record of 2–5 with 39 saves in 41 chances and an ERA of 2.73. He was one of the leading candidates for The Sporting News Comeback Player of the Year Award in the National League. In  innings, he struck out 79 hitters.

In 2002, Wagner went 4–2 with a 2.52 ERA, 88 strikeouts, and 35 saves in 75 innings. Then, he enjoyed his best season in 2003, when he reached career-highs in saves (44), innings pitched (86) and games (78), and got 105 strikeouts while leading the league in games finished. In that year, he also cemented his status as the hardest-throwing man in baseball by leading the major leagues with 159 pitches at 100 mph or above. Second on the list was starter Bartolo Colón with 12.

On June 11, 2003, Wagner closed out a no-hitter thrown by a record six pitchers against the New York Yankees.

Following the World Series, Wagner criticized the Astros front office for not building a playoff worthy team.  On November 3, Billy Wagner was informed that he had been traded to the Philadelphia Phillies.

Philadelphia Phillies

Wagner was traded to Philadelphia before the 2004 season, only to have his season shortened by a strain in his hand. He had the best ERA of his career in 2005 and again led the league in games finished. Wagner became a free agent after the 2005 season and signed a four-year, $43 million contract and a one-year club option with the New York Mets.

In a May 7, 2006 interview, Wagner stated that he was confronted by all of his former Phillies teammates in September 2005 after he had criticized their performance in the media by repeatedly saying that the Phillies had "no chance" of making the playoffs (which proved accurate, as the Phillies lost out on the playoffs by one game); Phillies left fielder Pat Burrell reported called Wagner a "rat." The confrontation reportedly was one of several factors that drove Wagner from Philadelphia in the 2005–2006 offseason.

New York Mets
Wagner finished 2006 with 40 saves and a 2.24 ERA and recorded his milestone 300th career save. His performance contributed to the Mets' first division championship in 18 years. However, he did not have a good post-season: he recorded three saves, but he lost one game and allowed six runs in the  innings that he pitched – an ERA of 10.40.

Wagner had a good first half of the season in 2007. He was successful in 17 out of 18 save chances, and his ERA was 1.94. July was his best month, when he recorded eight saves in eight chances; did not allow a run scored; and he won the D.H.L. "Delivery Man of the Month" Award. During that month, Wagner's ERA was 0.00, he gave up two hits, and he pitched enough innings to be equivalent to a complete game pitched. His performance earned him a slot on the National League All-Star Team.

The second half of Wagner's baseball season was not nearly as successful. He converted 13 out of 17 save chances, and his ERA was 3.90. Wagner's pitching performance declined during the final two months of the season. On August 30, Wagner failed to save the crucial fourth game of a four-game series between the Phillies and Mets. The final result was four-game sweep by the Phillies. This sweep turned out to be the difference in the season: the Mets finished one game behind the Phillies at the end of the regular season, completing a seven-game collapse. One more win against the Phillies would have allowed the Mets to win the division that year.

Wagner had an ERA of 6.23 in August of that season, and he suffered from back spasms during September.

On May 15, 2008, Wagner issued a tirade full of profanity against his teammates and coaches following the Mets' 1–0 loss in a game against the Washington Nationals. Some people have speculated that this was directed in particular toward his teammates Carlos Beltrán and Carlos Delgado about their not being available for interviews with the press following games. However, Wagner's pitching performance in April, May, and June was good enough to find him chosen by the All-Star Game's National League manager for his pitching staff.

During this All-Star Game, Wagner, pitching late in the game, surrendered a game-tying double to the American league's third baseman, Evan Longoria, and then the National League lost the ballgame in 15 innings.

In September 2008, the Mets announced that Wagner had torn the ulnar collateral ligament of his left elbow and also his flexor pronator tendon. These injuries required Tommy John surgery. This surgery, and its recovery, put Wagner out of play for a calendar year.

Wagner had a guaranteed-payment baseball contract, and he was paid a total of $10.5 million by the Mets in 2009. For the baseball year 2010, his contract gave the Mets an option to pay him $8 million for the season, or else to pay him $1 million to terminate the contract.

In the news conference following the announcement of his major elbow injury, Wagner vowed that he would return to playing Major League Baseball. Although he had previously stated that he would not pitch anymore following 2009, Wagner amended this by saying that he did not wish to end his baseball career in this fashion – ending it on a major injury. He also said that he had dreams of winning a World Series, and also of reaching a total of about 420 saves in his career.

However, Wagner stated furthermore that he had "played his last [baseball] game as a Met". Wagner explained that it would not make good business sense for the Mets to guarantee him $8 million for 2009, pitching or not pitching.

Despite these statements, Wagner remained on the Mets' 40-man roster on the disabled list at the beginning of the season in 2009, and still drawing his salary. He pitched for the first time in 2009 for the Mets late in the season on August 20, in a game against the Atlanta Braves. He pitched one inning with two strikeouts and giving up no hits or walks.

Boston Red Sox

On August 21, 2009, it was reported that the Boston Red Sox claimed Wagner off waivers from the Mets.  After initial reports suggested Wagner would invoke his no-trade clause to veto a trade, he agreed to be traded on August 25 for Chris Carter and Eddie Lora, with the added stipulation that the Red Sox could not exercise his $8 million option for 2010, but could offer him salary arbitration. The Red Sox did offer Wagner arbitration, but he declined so the Red Sox received the first-round draft pick from the team that signed Wagner (Atlanta Braves) and a sandwich pick in the 2010 rookie draft. His only victory in a Red Sox uniform came on September 9, against the Orioles.

Atlanta Braves
On December 2, 2009, Wagner and the Atlanta Braves agreed on a one-year contract worth $7 million that included a $6.5 million vesting option for the 2011 season. On April 30, 2010, Wagner revealed that he would retire at the end of the 2010 season to spend more time with his family.  In a game against the Detroit Tigers on June 25, Wagner achieved his 400th career save. After the game, he told reporters that he still planned to retire after the 2010 season.  On July 11, Wagner was selected as an injury replacement to the 2010 National League All-Star roster, which he declined due to an ankle injury.

He played his final regular season game on October 3, 2010, and struck out the final four batters he faced – the last three of whom struck out looking.  He concluded his final major league regular season with a career-best 1.43 ERA.  Wagner made his final major league appearance on October 8 in Game 2 of the 2010 National League Division Series against the San Francisco Giants. Wagner suffered an injury to his left oblique and left the game after facing just two batters. The Braves eventually lost the series before Wagner could recover.

Post-playing career

Wagner retired to Crozet, Virginia, following the 2010 season.

On February 12, 2011, Wagner reiterated his intention to retire, stating, "I'm totally content with not playing baseball," Wagner said. "I love watching it, I love talking about it. If I miss anything, it would be some of the guys I played with and actually competing on the field, but other than that, you can keep it."

On March 30, 2011, the Braves officially released Wagner.
Billy Wagner is currently the Baseball Coach for The Miller School of Albemarle in Virginia. He coached against his high school alma mater and his own high school coach on April 6, 2013.  The Mavericks won the 2017 and 2018 Virginia Independent Schools Athletic Association Division II championship.

Accomplishments and honors

Career perspective
Of all pitchers with at least 800 innings pitched, Wagner's 11.9 K/9 and 33.2% strikeout rate total batters faced are both the highest in major league history. Opposing batters hit for only a .187 average against him, lowest in MLB history with 800+ innings pitched. Wagner also has the lowest hits per nine innings ratio (H/9) in history, for pitchers with 800+ innings, allowing 5.99 hits per nine innings.  In 2019, Wagner was inducted into the National College Baseball Hall of Fame.

National Baseball Hall of Fame consideration
Wagner has appeared on balloting for the National Baseball Hall of Fame since 2016 when he received 10.5% of the vote, well short of the 75% required for election, but above the 5% minimum required to remain on the ballot. His support has increased from 46.4%, as of the 2021 ballot, to 51.0% on the 2022 ballot, his seventh appearance. A player may appear on the ballot a maximum of 10 times.

See also

 Houston Astros award winners and league leaders
 List of Houston Astros no-hitters
 List of Houston Astros team records
 List of Major League Baseball career games finished leaders
 List of Major League Baseball career games played as a pitcher leaders
 List of Major League Baseball no-hitters
 Virginia Sports Hall of Fame and Museum

References

External links

1971 births
Living people
Atlanta Braves players
Auburn Astros players
Baseball players from Virginia
Binghamton Mets players
Boston Red Sox players
Ferrum College alumni
Ferrum Panthers baseball players
Gulf Coast Mets players
Houston Astros players
Jackson Generals (Texas League) players
Major League Baseball pitchers
National League All-Stars
New York Mets players
People from Tazewell County, Virginia
Philadelphia Phillies players
Quad Cities River Bandits players
Reading Phillies players
Round Rock Express players
St. Lucie Mets players
Tucson Toros players
People from Albemarle County, Virginia
Brewster Whitecaps players
National College Baseball Hall of Fame inductees